Large Interior with Three Reflections is a 1993 pop art painting by Roy Lichtenstein.

See also
 1993 in art

References

External links
 Lichtenstein Foundation website

1993 paintings
Paintings by Roy Lichtenstein